The 2014–15 UC Davis Aggies men's basketball team represented the University of California, Davis during the 2014–15 NCAA Division I men's basketball season. The Aggies, led by fourth year head coach Jim Les, played their home games at The Pavilion as members of the Big West Conference. They finished the season 25–7, 14–2 in Big West play to win the Big West regular season championship. They advanced to the semifinals of the Big West tournament where they lost to Hawaii. As a regular season conference champion who failed to win their conference tournament, they received an automatic bid to the National Invitation Tournament where they lost in the first round to Stanford.

Roster

Schedule
Source: 

|-
!colspan=9 style="background:#CB992B; color:#182563;"| Non-Conference Games

|-
!colspan=9 style="background:#CB992B; color:#182563;"| Conference Games

|-
!colspan=9 style="background:#CB992B; color:#182563;"| Big West tournament

|-
!colspan=9 style="background:#CB992B; color:#182563;"| NIT

References

UC Davis Aggies men's basketball seasons
UC Davis
UC Davis